Roda, meaning "wheel" or, more appropriately in this case, "circle" in Portuguese, is the circular formation within which participants perform in any of several Afro-Brazilian dance art forms, such as capoeira, maculelê and samba de roda.  By extension, the whole event may be called a roda (as in "We will have a roda next Saturday"). Likewise, sometimes a roda may not take the shape of a circle; it may be, for example, a half-circle if the event is a public performance, in order for the public to be able to see the performers easily. In English language this dance arrangement is called "jamming".

The people who form the roda will take turns (usually with no predefined order) in going inside the circle. Some of the people in the roda may be mere spectators, in the sense that they will not go inside the circle, but they are usually expected to contribute to the roda by at least clapping and singing.

This can be compared to other art forms, such as tap dancing, where participants will form a circle and take turns in performing inside the circle.

Part of the etiquette of the roda means that the people in it should try to keep the roda circular and fill in any "gaps" that may appear if someone leaves the roda; in other words, the people should be evenly distributed in the circumference of the roda, especially if there are not many people in it.

See also
Capoeira#Roda

References

Capoeira
Circle dances